The 2010 Montana Grizzlies football team represented the University of Montana in the 2010 NCAA Division I FCS football season. The Grizzlies, charter members of the Big Sky Conference, were led by first-year head coach Robin Pflugrad and played their home games on campus at Washington–Grizzly Stadium.

Schedule

Regular season

Western State

Cal Poly

Eastern Washington

Sacramento State

Northern Colorado

Idaho State

Portland State

Northern Arizona

Weber State

North Dakota

Montana State

References

Montana
Montana Grizzlies football seasons
Montana Grizzlies football